Khatunabad Rural District is a rural district (dehestan) in the Central District of Shahr-e Babak County, Kerman Province, Iran. At the 2006 census, its population (including Khatunabad, was subsequently split off from the rural district and promoted to city status) was 5,549, in 1,295 families; excluding Khatunabad, the population (as of 2006) was 1,686, in 395 families. The rural district has 28 villages.

References 

Rural Districts of Kerman Province
Shahr-e Babak County